Thiruvarppu  is a village in Kottayam district in the state of Kerala, India.7 kilometres  away from Kottayam Town. Thiruvarppu is famous for  the famous Krishna temple.

Demographics
 India census, Thiruvarppu had a population of 13324 with 6531 males and 6793 females.

Transportation
The nearest railway stations is Kottayam railway station, located almost 8 km away. The nearest International Airport is Cochin International Airport, located 89.4 km from Thiruvarppu. Multiple bus services also run between Thiruvarppu and other villages in Kottayam district.

See also
Chengalam South

References

Villages in Kottayam district